Eat Your Face is the eighth album by the Huntington Beach, California punk rock band Guttermouth, released in 2004 by Epitaph Records and Volcom Entertainment. It was hailed as a "return to form" after the stylistic experimentations of 2002's Gusto, going back to the band's tried-and-true style of fast, abrasive punk rock with tongue-in-cheek humor and sarcastic lyrics. The album marked a period of transition for the band, whose founding guitarist Eric Davis had left the group early in 2004 and been replaced by Donald Horne. It was also their only album with bassist Kevin Clark, and their last with longtime drummer Ty Smith. Lyrically it retained the band’s sense of biting sarcasm and expressed dissatisfaction with the U.S. electoral system and the current state of punk rock in the mainstream, amongst other topics.

In the summer of 2004 Guttermouth embarked on the Vans Warped Tour in support of Eat Your Face. However, the band's outrageous behavior and propensity for stirring up controversy soon led to problems on the tour. Singer Mark Adkins would often openly insult other acts from onstage, and the band members mocked the anti-Republican agenda of many of the tour's performers by selling T-shirts and displaying banners that proclaimed support for President George W. Bush. After several weeks the band abruptly left the tour, causing many rumors to circulate online and in the music press as to the reasons behind their departure, some claiming that they had been ejected and others that they had been asked to leave. Eventually Adkins issued a statement admitting that the band had left the tour voluntarily, due in part to his distate for the political atmosphere surrounding it.

Eat Your Face was released jointly by Epitaph Records and Volcom Entertainment. It would be the band's final recording for Epitaph, as they would move fully to Volcom for their next album, 2006's Shave the Planet.

Track listing
All songs written by Guttermouth
"Party of Two (Your Table is Ready)" - 2:53
"Surf's Up Asshole" - 3:15
"Octopus Hairpiece" - 2:19
"Wasted Lives" - 2:10
"The Next Faux Mohican" - 2:42
"Season" - 1:58
"Second DUI" - 2:31
"My Neighbor's Baby" - 2:54
"Guadalahabra (The La Habra Spirit)" - 2:33
"NRAA" - 1:59
"I Read it on a Bathroom Wall in Reno" - 1:52
"Ticket to Quebec" - 1:11
"Hot Dog to the Head (A Hot Dog is a Food Not a Penis So Get it Right or Pay the Price)" - 11:45

Performers
Mark Adkins - vocals
Scott Sheldon - guitar
Donald "Don" Horne - guitar
Kevin Clark  - bass guitar
William Tyler "Ty" Smith - drums

Album information
Record label: Epitaph Records
Recorded at Criterion Studios and Harcourt Studios April 5–10, 2004
Produced by Scott Sheldon and Donald Horne
Engineered by Brent
Engineered by Brent, Scott Sheldon, and Donald Horne
Mastered by Gene Grimaldi at Oasis Mastering

2004 albums
Guttermouth albums
Epitaph Records albums
Volcom Entertainment albums